Hype SA is a hip hop magazine in South Africa. The magazine was started in 2004. It is part of Panorama Media Corp and is published on a quarterly basis. Hype SA is the only magazine in South Africa which covers the hip-hop culture.

References

Quarterly magazines
Hip hop magazines
Magazines published in South Africa